Đào Thiên Hải (born 10 May 1978 in Sa Đéc) is a Vietnamese chess player and trainer. In 1995 he became the first Vietnamese player to be awarded the title of Grandmaster.

Chess career
Đào made his international debut at the age of 11 in the 1989 World Junior Championship in Tunja, Colombia, finishing in equal 30th place with a score of 6/13. He won the 1993 World Under-16 Championship in Bratislava. Following this he was awarded the title of International Master; the Grandmaster title followed in 1995.

He participated in three FIDE World Championships knockout events. At the 2000 event in New Delhi, he defeated Ruslan Ponomariov but lost to Michael Adams in the second round. In Moscow in 2001, he lost in the first round to Gilberto Milos. He was once again eliminated in the first round at Tripoli in 2004, this time by Zdenko Kožul. In 2005 Đào competed in the FIDE World Cup, where he was knocked out in round 1 by Sergei Rublevsky.

In 2006 he won the 3rd IGB Dato' Arthur Tan Malaysia Open in Kuala Lumpur.

Đào has represented Vietnam at eleven Olympiads, beginning in 1990 at the age of 12, and at every Olympiad from 1994 to 2012. He also represented Vietnam at seven Asian Team Chess championships  and at the 2006 Asian Games in Doha, Qatar, where he won a silver medal in the Men's individual rapid event.

References

External links
 
 
 
 
 

1978 births
Living people
Vietnamese chess players
Chess grandmasters
Chess Olympiad competitors
People from Đồng Tháp Province
Asian Games medalists in chess
Asian Games silver medalists for Vietnam
Chess players at the 2006 Asian Games
Medalists at the 2006 Asian Games
Southeast Asian Games medalists in chess
Southeast Asian Games gold medalists for Vietnam
Competitors at the 2011 Southeast Asian Games